The 1967 Stanley Cup playoffs of the National Hockey League (NHL) was the conclusion of the 1966–67 NHL season, and the final playoffs before the expansion from six to twelve teams. The Toronto Maple Leafs defeated the defending champion Montreal Canadiens in six games to win the Stanley Cup. The Leafs squad was the oldest ever to win a Cup final; the average age of the team was well more than 30, and four players were more than 40. Toronto has not won the Cup or been to the Finals since.

Format
In the semi-finals, the Chicago Black Hawks who finished in first place played the third-place Toronto Maple Leafs. The second-place Montreal Canadiens played the fourth-place New York Rangers. The winner of the semi-finals series would play for the championship and Stanley Cup.

Series

Playoff bracket

Semifinals

(1) Chicago Black Hawks vs. (3) Toronto Maple Leafs 
The Chicago Black Hawks was the best regular season team with 94 points. The Toronto Maple Leafs earned the third seed with 75 points. This was the sixth playoff series between these two teams, with Toronto winning three of their five previous series. Their most recent series had come in the 1962 Stanley Cup Finals, which Toronto won in six games. Chicago earned eighteen of twenty-eight points in this year's regular season series.

Despite Chicago's impressive regular season marks, the third seed Toronto Maple Leafs beat the Black Hawks in the first round of the playoffs.

(2) Montreal Canadiens vs. (4) New York Rangers 
Montreal earned the second seed with 77 points. New York earned the fourth seed with 72 points. This was the eighth playoff series between these two teams, with New York winning four of their seven previous series. Their most recent series had come in the 1957 semifinals, where Montreal defeated New York in five games. Montreal earned sixteen out of twenty-eight points in this year's regular season series.

Montreal defeated the Rangers in a four-game sweep.

Finals

The Montreal Canadiens were the two-time defending Stanley Cup champions. In the 1966 Stanley Cup Finals, Montreal defeated Detroit in six games. This was their twenty-fourth Stanley Cup Final overall, having won the championship fourteen times previously. This was the Toronto Maple Leafs' twenty-first and most recent Stanley Cup Final, having won twelve championships previously. This was the thirteenth playoff series between these two teams, and they split their twelve previous series. Their most recent series came in the 1966 semifinals, where Montreal won in a four-game sweep. These teams split their fourteen-game regular season series. 

After splitting the first four games, the Maple Leafs won games five and six to win the series.

Statistical leaders

Leading scorers

Leading goaltenders

Awards and records
 Conn Smythe Trophy (playoff MVP) –  Dave Keon, Toronto Maple Leafs

See also
 1966–67 NHL season

References

External links
 1967 NHL Playoffs Leaders, Hockey-reference.com

Stanley Cup playoffs
playoffs